Calycellina is a genus of fungi in the family Hyaloscyphaceae. The genus contains about 43 species.

Species
Calycellina albida
Calycellina angulata
Calycellina asperipila
Calycellina calycelloides
Calycellina camelliae
Calycellina caricina
Calycellina carolinensis
Calycellina chalarae
Calycellina chlorinella
Calycellina dennisii
Calycellina ericae
Calycellina fagina
Calycellina guttulifera
Calycellina hygrophila
Calycellina ilicis
Calycellina indumenticola
Calycellina juniperina
Calycellina lauri
Calycellina leucella
Calycellina lunispora
Calycellina lutea
Calycellina luzulae
Calycellina lycopodii
Calycellina microspis
Calycellina montana
Calycellina myriadea
Calycellina nemorosa
Calycellina nigrostipitata
Calycellina obscura
Calycellina ochracea
Calycellina operta
Calycellina osmundae
Calycellina phalaridis
Calycellina populina
Calycellina praetermissa
Calycellina pulviscula
Calycellina punctata
Calycellina rivelinensis
Calycellina rosae
Calycellina rubescens
Calycellina sadleriae
Calycellina sorido-pulvinata
Calycellina spiraeae
Calycellina thindii
Calycellina viridiflavescens

References

Leotiomycetes genera
Hyaloscyphaceae